Facundo Argüello may refer to:

 Facundo Argüello (footballer) (born 1979), association football player
 Facundo Argüello (tennis) (born 1992), tennis player